Enneapterygius paucifasciatus, the New Caledonian striped triplefin or reticulate triplefin, is a species of triplefin blenny in the genus Enneapterygius. It was described by Ronald Fricke in 1994.

References

paucifasciatus
Fish described in 1994